The Parco Botanico Friulano "Cormor", also known as the Parco del Cormor or Parco Botanico del Cormôr, is a municipal park and botanical garden located in Udine, Friuli, Italy.

The park was created 1990–93 by architect Roberto Pirzio Biroli, for which he won the International Piranesi Award, on a neglected site northwest of the town center. It covers 30 hectares between the Cormôr torrent and the Autostrada Alpe-Adria (A23), with dense plantings of woodland, open lawns, a belvedere, paths and small roads, and a children's play area.

See also 
 List of botanical gardens in Italy

References

External links 
 Parco del Cormor (Italian)
 Map with plant list (Italian)
 Parco botanico friulano "Cormor" plant list (Italian)
 BGCI entry
 Parco Botanico del Cormôr calendar
 Parco del Cormor history

Botanical gardens in Italy
Buildings and structures in Udine
Gardens in Friuli-Venezia Giulia
Parks in Friuli-Venezia Giulia